Grzegorz Fitelberg (18 October 1879 – 10 June 1953) was a Polish conductor, violinist and composer. He was a member of the Young Poland group, together with artists such as Karol Szymanowski, Ludomir Różycki and Mieczysław Karłowicz.

Life and career
Fitelberg was born into a Jewish family (father Hozjasz Fitelberg, mother Matylda Pintzof, sister Leja Wacholder, 1881–1941, were all murdered in the Holocaust), in Daugavpils, Russian Empire (now Latvia). Between 1906–07, he performed several times at the Berlin Philharmonic. In 1908 he conducted in the Warsaw Opera, and between 1912–13 in the Vienna State Opera. During the first war he collaborated with Ballets Russes; he conducted the first performance of Igor Stravinsky's Mavra at the Opéra Garnier in Paris. From 1921 to 1934 he was the chief conductor of the Warsaw Philharmonic Orchestra, where he excessively promoted new music. In 1935 he organized the Polish National Radio Symphony Orchestra. Between 1940–41, he conducted at the Teatro Colón in Buenos Aires. Throughout his career, he performed in various locations around the world including Paris, Monte Carlo, Brussels, Vienna, Dresden, Leipzig, Moscow, Bristol, London, The Hague, Buenos Aires, New York, Montreal and Toronto. He died in Katowice, Poland in June 1953.

His son was the Polish-American composer Jerzy Fitelberg, who predeceased him. His second wife, Halina Schmolz, was a ballet dancer who died in 1939, from wounds suffered during the bombing of the Poniatowski Bridge. Their home, Willa Fitelberga, has been restored.

The Grzegorz Fitelberg International Competition for Conductors, one of the most important music competitions in Poland, takes place in the Silesian Philharmonic since 1979.

Awards
Order of the Banner of Work (Poland, 1950)
Commander's Cross of the Order of Polonia Restituta (Poland, 1947)
Knight's Cross of Legion of Honour (France)
Commander's Cross of the Order of the Phoenix (Greece, 1938)
Golden Cross of Merit (Poland, 1932)
Officer's Cross of the Order of Polonia Restituta (Poland, 1927)

See also
Antoni Wit
Music of Poland

References

External links

 Official website of The Grzegorz Fitelberg International Competition for Conductors 

Polish classical composers
Polish male classical composers
Polish conductors (music)
Male conductors (music)
Polish classical violinists
Male classical violinists
Polish music educators
Chopin University of Music alumni
19th-century Polish Jews
Musicians from Daugavpils
1879 births
1953 deaths
20th-century classical composers
20th-century conductors (music)
20th-century classical violinists
20th-century male musicians